The 2006 Neighborhood Excellence 400 presented by Bank of America was the thirteenth race of the 2006 NASCAR Nextel Cup Series season. Matt Kenseth of Roush Racing won the race, giving him his second win of the season. Jamie McMurray, his teammate, finished second and Kevin Harvick finished third.

Qualifying

Results

Failed to qualify: Carl Long (#34), Donnie Neuenberger (#52), Chad Chaffin (#61), and Stanton Barrett (#95).

Race Statistics
 Time of race: 3:38:27
 Average Speed: 
 Pole Speed: 154.633
 Cautions: 9 for 51 laps
 Margin of Victory: 0.787 sec
 Lead changes: 23
 Percent of race run under caution: 12.8%         
 Average green flag run: 34.9 laps

References

Neighborhood Excellence 400
Neighborhood Excellence 400
NASCAR races at Dover Motor Speedway
June 2006 sports events in the United States